HD 215497 b is an extrasolar planet which orbits the K-type main sequence star HD 215497, located approximately 142 light years away in the constellation Tucana. This planet has at least 6.6 times the mass of Earth. This planet was detected by HARPS on October 19, 2009, together with 29 other planets, including HD 215497 c.

References

Exoplanets discovered in 2009
Exoplanets detected by radial velocity
Terrestrial planets
Super-Earths
Tucana (constellation)